The Battle of Mullaitivu (Mulativ Saṭana), also known as the First Battle of Mullaitivu and codenamed Operation Unceasing Waves-1, was a battle between the militant Liberation Tigers of Tamil Eelam (LTTE or Tamil Tigers) and the Sri Lankan military during the Sri Lankan Civil War for control of the military base in Mullaitivu in north-eastern Sri Lanka.

The base was overrun by the LTTE on 18 July 1996 and, after a failed rescue operation involving all three forces, the Sri Lankan military abandoned the base, and control of much of Mullaitivu District, to the LTTE on 25 July 1996. Around 1,400 Sri Lankan troops were killed and large amounts of military equipment captured by the LTTE. 315 LTTE cadres were also killed.

Background
After losing control of the Jaffna peninsula in late 1995/early 1996 the LTTE retreated to the Vanni on the mainland, saving most of their arsenal and establishing their headquarters in Kilinochchi.

The military base
Back in June 1990 the Sri Lankan military started expanding its military base at Mullaitivu, forcing the entire population of the town of Mullaitivu to flee. The base expanded over the years to incorporate the entire town. It became one of the largest military bases in Sri Lanka, occupying an area of 2,900m by 1,500m with a perimeter of 8,500m. The base was surrounded by the sea to the east, the Nanthi Kadal lagoon to west and dense vegetation to the north and south.

The base was isolated with the nearest base being at Manal Aru/Weli Oya, some 35 km to the south. There was no overland supply route to the base and all supplies had to brought in by sea and air, something that the navy and air force struggled with. The base's security precautions had been strengthened in 1995 and a contingency plan was drawn up in the event of an overnight attack. Under the plan reinforcements would arrive by sea and air the following morning. Radars and two generators, one acting as a back-up, were installed.

The base was responsible for monitoring the Sea Tigers, the LTTE's naval division, and smuggling. It was the headquarters of the army's 25 Brigade. The 6th battalion of the Vijayabahu Infantry Regiment, commanded by Major T. R. A. Aliba, and the 9th battalion of the Sinha Regiment, were stationed at the base. The base's strength was 1,407 just prior to the battle (1,268 army; 9 navy; 49 police; 81 civilians). On the day of the attack the base's two most senior officers, brigade commander Colonel U. B. Lawrence Fernando and his deputy Lieutenant Colonel Gunaratne, were away in Colombo on duty leave.

LTTE preparations
The LTTE believed that the Sri Lankan military were planning to attack Kilinochchi in mid July 1996. In order to forestall such an attack the LTTE started preparing plans to attack the military base in Mullaitivu. However, in order to divert attention away from Mullaitivu, the LTTE started amassing cadres near the military bases at Elephant Pass and Pooneryn. In late June 1996 they started moving coffins within sight of military observation posts in order to raise suspicions in the military.

The LTTE's preparations took many weeks to complete. LTTE leader V. Prabhakaran had been personally involved in the preparations for the attack which was coded named Operation Unceasing Waves. Colonel Balraj was responsible for co-ordinating the LTTE operation.

In May 1996 the military monitored a large build up of LTTE forces near the base which was placed on "red alert". The LTTE lost 5 recon soldiers during their reconnaissance mission on the base. In addition to these, they also lost 8 more recon soldiers while they were leading the Tamil Tigers' attack teams into the base complex.

Battle

Base over-run
At around 1:30 am on 18 July 1996 approximately 2,000 LTTE cadres attacked the military base in Mullaitivu from the north and south whilst the Sea Tigers attacked from the east. After eight hours of heavy fighting the LTTE entered the center of the base, having over-run the forward defence lines and clusters of mini-bases. The LTTE then concentrated their attack on the artillery sites and armouries, capturing them within an hour. The tall communication tower at the base was destroyed.

The LTTE's attack was paused just short of the heart of the base, the operational headquarters of the 6th battalion of the Vijayabahu Infantry Regiment. Fearing death if captured, soldiers from the 6th battalion fought tenaciously, hoping that they could hold on until a relief force arrived. The LTTE commanders were given orders to regroup and wait for nightfall before attacking the heart of the base.

Rescue operation
News of the attack soon reached Colombo and within hours of the start of the attack the three service commanders - Lieutenant General Rohan Daluwatte (army), Rear Admiral Mohan Samarasekera (navy) and Air Marshall Oliver Ranasinghe (air force) - were flown to the Elephant Pass military base to oversee the rescue effort. The trio, together with other senior military officers, put into motion Operation Thrivida Pahara (Operation Three Strikes) which began before dawn on 18 July 1996.

When they arrived in Mullaitivu they were to transfer to a naval landing craft, move closer to the shore, transfer to dinghies and make an amphibious landing on the beach-head.

Meanwhile, the navy's eastern command and the air force's eastern zonal command, both based in Trincomalee, joined the rescue attempt. The air force's MI-24 helicopter gunships, Pucara bombers and Kfir interceptor jets began strafing LTTE in and around the base.

275 commandos from the 1st battalion of the Special Forces Regiment, led by Lieutenant Colonel A. F. Lafir, were despatched to the area using MI-17 troop transport helicopters. The commandos were to establish a beach-head so that the infantry reinforcements from Jaffna peninsula could make an amphibious landing but as they advanced towards the base they were slowed down by heavy resistance from the LTTE. Kfir jets were called into support the advancing commandos but they ended up firing on the commandos. 20 soldiers were killed and more than 60 were wounded as a result of friendly fire. Base commander Colonel Lawrence Fernando, who had been accompanying Lafir and the commandos, was left wounded and unconscious following an attack by Kfir jets.

The LTTE, who were now fighting on two fronts, concentrated their efforts on the base which was entirely captured by the evening of 18 July 1996.

The 2nd battalion of the Special Forces Regiment, led by Colonel Raj Vijayasiri, who had been carrying out operations in Kudumbimalai/Thoppigala, were despatched on the evening of 18 July 1996, via Punanai and Trincomalee, to support the 1st battalion. The 2nd battalion managed to make radio contact with a group of isolated troops inside the base. Lafir was fatally wounded on the morning of 19 July 1996 when shrapnel from mortar fire pierced his brain - he died later that morning. 36 other commandos were killed whilst 60 more were wounded.

As 18 July 1996 drew to a close the three service commanders re-located to Trincomalee. The Joint Operations Headquarters, which had been functioning from Anuradhapura, was moved temporarily to SLAF China Bay near Trincomalee.

After much delay, the infantry reinforcements from Jaffna peninsula reached the high seas off Mullaitivu at dawn on 19 July 1996 but it was afternoon when they began moving towards the coast, escorted by navy patrol boats. At around 4.30pm the SLNS Ranaviru, one of the escort vessels, was surrounded by six Sea Tigers boats. The Ranaviru managed to destroy two Sea Tigers boats before a third rammed into the Ranaviru, causing it to explode and killing 36 sailors on board. Only seven bodies could be recovered from the seas in the ensuing gun battle. The attempts to land troops by sea were aborted.

MI-17 helicopters trying to drop troops near Alampil encountered heavy resistance from the LTTE so a decision was made to drops troops at another location. On 20 July 1996 one of the MI-17 helicopters sustained damage to its fuel pipeline following fire from LTTE but managed to safely return to a neighbouring base.

The navy landed troops belonging to the 2nd battalion of the Commando Regiment, 6th battalion of the Sri Lanka Light Infantry and 7th battalion of the Gemunu Watch at the beach-head on 21 July 1996. The troops came under heavy mortar fire from the LTTE and it wasn't until 23 July 1996 that they started advancing, under heavy LTTE fire, towards the base. When they reached the southern perimeter of the base they discovered that all the buildings inside the base had been razed to the ground. There was unbearable stench of decayed and dismembered bodies and many of the troops felt physically sick. There was a fear that the LTTE had mined and booby trapped the base. The troops also faced resistance from LTTE positions in the northern and western ends of the base.

Withdrawal
The government wanted to hold onto the base and rebuild it but this was opposed by senior military commanders who didn't want to divert resources to maintain and defend an isolated outpost which was vulnerable to another LTTE attack. They wanted to abandon the base to prevent further loss and so orders were given to abandon the rescue operation and withdraw the troops, which took place on 24 and 25 July 1996. The withdrawal also faced problems and in one instance a large group of soldiers were left stranded on the beach and were all killed by the LTTE.

Over the next few weeks two officers and 62 soldiers returned to safety. Some had hidden up coconut trees or shallow wells before escaping. Some had trekked through jungles to reach the safety of military bases at Kokkutuduwai, Weli Oya and Elephant Pass. One soldier had managed to swim, under LTTE fire, to a naval patrol boat only for his identity to be scrutinised heavily before being allowed on board.

Censorship and losses
News of the battle was widely reported around the world but the Sri Lankan public were kept largely in the dark as a result of censorship. President Chandrika Kumaratunga had issued the Emergency (Prohibition on Publication and Transmission of Sensitive Military Information) Regulations No 1 of 1996 proclamation under the Public Security Ordinance on 19 April 1996 imposing a news blackout about military operations.

The LTTE however continued to publicise the battle through its international secretariat in London. On 22 July 1996 they issued statement claiming that they had killed 1,208 soldiers and officers and that 241 of their own cadres had also been killed.

Censorship was lifted on 8 October 1996 when Deputy Defence Minister Anuruddha Ratwatte, the President's first cousin once removed, informed Parliament that the strength of the base was 1,407 but that only 12 had been killed in action. Ratwatte claimed that the 415 and 43 bodies handed over by the Red Cross to government officials in Kilinochchi and Vavuniya were not "identifiable as our soldiers". According to Ratwatte 71 troops had been killed during Thrivida Pahara, the rescue operation.

Around 1,400 Sri Lankan troops were killed. The army lost around 1,200 personnel whilst the navy lost a small contingent. Official records of the Ministry of Defence indicate 1,173 were killed, 80 civilians and 50 police officers stationed at the base were also killed. According to the military the LTTE had executed 207 prisoners of war after one of the POWs hurled a grenade, killing at least six LTTE cadres. The LTTE lost around 315 cadres in total.

Captured weapons by LTTE
Besides the weaponry, the LTTE also captured communication equipment, naval boats and armoured vehicles such as South African built Buffels. The value of the military equipment removed by the LTTE was put in excess of US$20 million. The haul was considered too much for the LTTE's small number of cadres to handle.

Aftermath
Daluwatte appointed a three-member court of inquiry (Major General Patrick Fernando, chair; Major General E. H. Samaratunga; and Brigadier Gamini Hettiarachchi) to inquire into how and why the defences at Mullaitivu failed and to estimate the loss of equipment. The court sat in Colombo and Anuradhapura and heard evidence from those involved including most of those who managed to escape from the base. The inquiry's findings were kept secret. A naval court of inquiry headed by Rear Admiral H. C. A. C. Thisera also took place.

Lafir was posthumously awarded the Parama Weera Vibhushanaya, the highest decoration awarded by the Sri Lankan military. In 1998 military intelligence revealed that Captain Suresh Raj, a military officer based at Mullaitivu, had assisted the LTTE.

On 26 July the army launched Operation Sath Jaya from its base in Elephant Pass and after heavy fighting captured Kilinochchi in late September 1996. The LTTE recaptured Kilinochchi in late September 1998. Mullaitivu and Kilinochchi remained under LTTE control until the final stages of the civil war when they were re-captured by Sri Lankan military in January 2009.

The army unveiled a war memorial on 18 July 2010 for 1,163 troops killed during the "Mullaitivu debacle".

Notes

References

1996 in Sri Lanka
Battles of Eelam War III
Conflicts in 1996
History of Mullaitivu
July 1996 events in Asia
Mullaitivu (1996)
Mass murder in 1996
Sri Lankan Civil War prisoner of war massacres